Bates House may refer to:

in Canada
Bate-Fenton House, Sandy Hill, Ottawa, Ontario, also called Bate's House

in the United States
Daisy Bates House, Little Rock, Arkansas, listed on the National Register of Historic Places (NRHP)
Sherman Bates House, Hardy, Arkansas, NRHP-listed
Sherman and Merlene Bates House, Hardy, Arkansas, NRHP-listed in Sharp County, Arkansas
Bates-Hendricks House, Indianapolis, Indiana, NRHP-listed
Elbert-Bates House, Albia, Iowa, NRHP-listed in Monroe County, Iowa
Bates House (Bedford, Kentucky), NRHP-listed
Bates Log House, Lexington, Kentucky, NRHP-listed
David Back Log House and Farm, Letcher County, Kentucky, NRHP-listed
Levin Bates House, Buechel, LaFayette County, Kentucky, NRHP-listed
Judge Bates House, Houston, Mississippi, NRHP-listed
Bates-Geers House, near Plato, Missouri, NRHP-listed in Texas County, Missouri
Cyrus Bates House, Henderson, Jefferson County, New York, NRHP-listed in Jefferson County, New York
Rufus and Flora Bates House, Ithaca, New York, NRHP-listed in Tompkins County, New York
Bates Cobblestone Farmhouse, Middlesex, New York, NRHP-listed in Yates County, New York
Richardson-Bates House, Oswego, New York, NRHP-listed in Oswego County, New York
Bates-Englehardt Mansion, St. Johnsville, New York, NRHP-listed in Montgomery County, New York
Cozad–Bates House,  University Circle, Cleveland, Ohio, NRHP-listed
Bates-Cockrem House, Sandusky, Erie County, Ohio, NRHP-listed 
Bates-Seller House, Portland, Oregon, NRHP-listed
John M. and Elizabeth Bates House No. 1, NRHP-listed in Portland, Oregon
John M. and Elizabeth Bates House No. 2, NRHP-listed in Lake Oswego, Oregon
John M. and Elizabeth Bates House No. 3, NRHP-listed in Lake Oswego, Oregon
John M. and Elizabeth Bates House No. 4, NRHP-listed in Lake Oswego, Oregon
William Bates House, in Greenville County near Greenville, South Carolina, NRHP-listed
Bates-Sheppard House, Cuero, TX, NRHP-listed in De Witt County, Texas
Martin M. Bates Farmstead, Richmond, Vermont, NRHP-listed in Chittendon County, Vermont
Bates-Tanner Farm, Bothell, Washington, NRHP-listed in Snohomish County, Washington

See also
Bates Building, Cincinnati, Ohio, NRHP-listed
Bates Tourist Court, Marshall, AR, NRHP-listed in Searcy County, Arkansas
Bates Park Historic District, Des Moines, Iowa, NRHP-listed
Bates Round Barn, near Greene, New York, NRHP-listed in Chenango County, New York
Bates Well Ranch, near Ajo, Arizona, NRHP-listed in Pima County, Arizona
Bates (disambiguation)
Bates (surname)